The Department of Science was an Australian government department that existed between December 1984 and July 1987. It was the third so-named Australian Government department.

Scope
Information about the department's functions and/or government funding allocation could be found in the Administrative Arrangements Orders, the annual Portfolio Budget Statements and in the department's annual reports.

According to the National Archives of Australia, at its creation, the department was responsible for:
Science policy and research
Patents of inventions and designs, and trade marks
Meteorology
Ionospheric prediction
Analytical laboratory services
Weights and measures
Administration of the Australian Antarctic Territory and the Territory of Heard Island and the McDonald Islands
Commission for the Future.

Structure
The department was an Australian Public Service department, staffed by officials who were responsible to the Minister for Science, Barry Jones.

The department was headed by a secretary, Greg Tegart.

References

Science
Ministries established in 1984